The Parsley massacre (Spanish: el corte "the cutting"; Creole: kout kouto-a "the stabbing") was a mass killing of Haitians living in the Dominican Republic's northwestern frontier and in certain parts of the contiguous Cibao region in October 1937. 
Dominican Army troops from different areas of the country
carried out the massacre on the orders of Dominican dictator Rafael Trujillo. As a result of the massacre, virtually the entire Haitian population in the Dominican frontier was either killed or forced to flee across the border. Some died while trying to flee to Haiti across the Dajabón River that divides the two countries on the island.

Dominican troops interrogated thousands of civilians demanding that each victim say the word "parsley". If the accused could not pronounce the word to the interrogators satisfaction, they were deemed to be Haitians and killed.

Massacre 

Dominican dictator Rafael Trujillo, a strong proponent of anti-Haitianism, made his intentions towards the Haitian community clear in a short speech he gave on 2 October 1937 during a celebration in his honor in the province of Dajabón. 

Trujillo reportedly acted in response to reports of Haitians stealing cattle and crops from Dominican borderland residents. Trujillo commanded his army to kill all Haitians living in the Dominican Republic's northwestern frontier and in certain parts of the contiguous Cibao region. Between October 2 and October 8, hundreds of Dominican troops, who came mostly from other areas of the country, poured into the region. These armed forces killed Haitians with rifles, machetes, shovels, knives, and bayonets. Haitian children were reportedly thrown in the air and caught by soldiers' bayonets, then thrown on their mothers' corpses. Survivors who managed to cross the border and return to Haiti told stories of family members being hacked with machetes and strangled by the soldiers, and children bashed against rocks and tree trunks. The use of military units from outside the region was not always enough to expedite soldiers' killings of Haitians. U.S. legation informants reported that many soldiers "confessed that in order to perform such ghastly slaughter they had to get 'blind' drunk." Several months later, a barrage of killings and repatriations of Haitians occurred in the southern frontier.

Lauren Derby claims that a majority of those who died were born in the Dominican Republic and belonged to well-established Haitian communities in the borderlands.

Contributing factors

Haitian-Dominican relations have long been strained by territorial disputes and competition for the resources of Hispaniola. Between the years of 1910–1930, there was an extensive migration of Haitians to their neighboring countries of the Dominican Republic and Cuba in search of work. The exact number of Haitian migration to the Dominican Republic is not readily available but it is more than the estimated 200,000 that emigrated to Cuba. Among several authors, the Haiti-Dominican Republic migration corridor is considered far more important than the Haiti-Cuba migration due to geographic proximity. On the other hand, the large influx of Haitians to the Dominican Republic further divided the complicated relationship between the two states. The Dominican Republic, formerly the Spanish colony of Santo Domingo, is the eastern portion of the island of Hispaniola and occupies five-eighths of the land while having ten million inhabitants. In contrast, Haiti, the former French colony of Saint-Domingue, is on the western three-eighths of the island and has almost exactly the same population, with an estimated 200 people per square kilometre.

Due to inadequate roadways connecting the borderlands to major cities, "Communication with Dominican markets was so limited that the small commercial surplus of the frontier slowly moved toward Haiti."

Furthermore, the Dominican government saw the loose borderlands as a liability in terms of possible formation of revolutionary groups that could flee across the border with ease, while at the same time amassing weapons and followers.

Aftermath
At first the Haitian president Sténio Vincent prohibited any discussion of the massacre and issued a statement on 15 October: "...it is declared that the good relations between Haiti and the Dominican Republic have not suffered any damage." Vincent's failure to initially press for justice for the slain workers prompted protests in Port-au-Prince after two years of relative silence. It was known that Vincent had a cooperative relationship and financial support from the Trujillo government. After a failed coup effort in December the Haitian president was eventually forced to seek an international investigation and mediation. Unwilling to submit to an inquiry, Trujillo offered instead an indemnity to Haiti.

In the end, the Democrat U.S. president Franklin D. Roosevelt and Haitian president Sténio Vincent sought reparations of $750,000, of which the Dominican government paid $525,000 (US$  in  dollars), or around $30 per victim. Due to the corruption deeply embedded within the Haitian bureaucracy however, survivors on average received only 2 cents each. In the agreement signed in Washington, D.C. on 31 January 1938, the Dominican government defended the massacre as a response to illegal immigration by "undesirable" Haitians, and recognized "no responsibility whatsoever" for the killings with Trujillo stating how the agreement established new laws prohibiting migration between Haiti and the Dominican Republic. Trujillo's regime thus used a moment of international inquiry to legitimize his anti-Haitian policies. 

Thereafter, Trujillo began to develop the borderlands to link them more closely with the main cities and urban areas of Dominican Republic. These areas were modernized, with the addition of modern hospitals, schools, political headquarters, military barracks, and housing projects—as well as a highway to connect the borderlands to major cities. Additionally, after 1937, quotas restricted the number of Haitians permitted to enter the Dominican Republic, and a strict and often discriminatory border policy was enacted. Dominicans continued to deport and kill Haitians in southern frontier regions—as refugees died of exposure, malaria and influenza.

Despite attempts to blame Dominican civilians, it has been confirmed by U.S. sources that "bullets from Krag rifles were found in Haitian bodies, and only Dominican soldiers had access to this type of rifle." Therefore, the Haitian Massacre, which is still referred to as "el corte" (the cutting) by Dominicans and as kouto-a (the knife) by Haitians, was, "...a calculated action on the part of Dominican dictator Rafael Trujillo to homogenize the furthest stretches of the country in order to bring the region into the social, political and economic fold," and rid his republic of Haitians.

Condemnation of the massacres was not limited to international sources, as a number of Trujillo's exiled political opponents also publicly spoke out against the events. In November 1937, four anti-Trujillistas were declared "unworthy Dominicans" and "traitors to the Homeland" for their comments—Rafael Brache, José Manuel Jimenes, Juan Isidro Jimenes Grullón, and Buenaventura Sánchez.

Etymology

The popular name for the massacre came from the shibboleth that the dictatorial Trujillo had his soldiers apply to determine whether or not those living on the border were native Afro-Dominicans or immigrant Afro-Haitians. Dominican soldiers would hold up a sprig of parsley to someone and ask what it was. How the person pronounced the Spanish word for parsley (perejil) determined their fate. The Haitian languages, French and Haitian Creole, pronounce the r as a uvular approximant or a voiced velar fricative, respectively so their speakers can have difficulty pronouncing the alveolar tap or the alveolar trill of Spanish, the language of the Dominican Republic. Also, only Spanish but not French or Haitian Creole pronounces the j as the voiceless velar fricative. If they could pronounce it the Spanish way the soldiers considered them Dominican and let them live, but if they pronounced it the French or Creole way they considered them Haitian and executed them.

The term parsley massacre was used frequently in the English-speaking media 75 years after the event, but most scholars recognize that it is a misconception, as research by Lauren Derby shows that the explanation is based more on myth than on personal accounts.

Number of victims
According to some sources, the massacre killed an estimated 20,000 Haitians living in the northern frontier—clearly at Trujillo's direct order. However, the exact number is impossible to calculate for many reasons. Among them is the fact that, although the Dominican Army murdered many of the victims in public view, they carried out most of the slayings en masse in isolated areas, leaving either no witnesses or just a few survivors. Another reason why the number of victims is unknown is that an untold but very great number of their bodies ended up either in the sea, where sharks consumed their remains, or in mass graves, where acidic soil degraded them, leaving nothing for forensic investigators to exhume.

Haitian President Élie Lescot put the death toll at 12,168; Haitian historian Jean Price-Mars cited 12,136 deaths and 2,419 injuries. The Dominican Republic's interim Foreign Minister put the number of dead at 17,000. Dominican historian Bernardo Vega estimated as many as 35,000.

See also 

1804 Haiti massacre
Beheadings of Moca
Dominican Republic–Haiti relations
History of Haiti
History of the Dominican Republic
List of massacres in the Dominican Republic
List of massacres in Haiti

References

External links
 80 Years On, Dominicans And Haitians Revisit Painful Memories Of Parsley Massacre (photos, audio, text)

1937 in Haiti
1937 in the Caribbean
History of the Dominican Republic
Third Dominican Republic
1937 in the Dominican Republic
Conflicts in 1937
Mass murder in 1937
October 1937 events
Massacres in 1937
Anti-Haitian sentiment
Anti-black racism in North America
Dominican Republic–Haiti relations
Ethnic cleansing in North America
Republic of Haiti (1859–1957)
Massacres in the Dominican Republic
Shibboleths
Human rights abuses in the Dominican Republic
Genocides in North America
Genocidal massacres
Racially motivated violence against black people